Ten Most Wanted (February 24, 2000 – January 8, 2013) was an American-bred Thoroughbred race horse and sire. Bred in Kentucky, he was owned by James Chisholm, Michael Jarvis and J. Paul Reddam. At the end of 2004, his fourth year, he had a record of 5–3–1 out of thirteen starts. In total, he won five of his 13 career starts. He retired from racing in 2004 and began his stud career at Magali Farms stud farm in Santa Ynez, California, where he sired 71 stakes winners including Lady On the Run and Tenth Power. He died on January 8, 2013, at the age of 12 in Panama at the British Mist Breeding Station.  He had been moved there in late November 2012 after being sold for more stud duty.

Racing career

Ten Most Wanted had his first start at Hollywood Park in November 2002 where he finished in second place.

He broke his maiden at Santa Anita on January 5, 2003. On April 5, 2003, he won the Illinois Derby and was prepped for the Kentucky Derby.  However, he stumbled during the race and finished in ninth place at Churchill Downs (2003 race results).  His owners decided to race him in the Belmont Stakes and he finished 2nd to Empire Maker. He then ran the Travers Stakes at Saratoga on August 23, 2003, and the Louisiana Downs Super Derby on September 20, 2003, both of which he won.  His last race was at Hawthorne in what was the National Jockey Club Handicap (which has since be renamed Bill Hartack Memorial Handicap) on April 17, 2004 and he finished in first place.

Stud career
Ten Most Wanted began his stud career at Gainesway Farm in Lexington, Kentucky. He later stood at Sequel Stallions New York, and recently was taken to Magali Farm in Santa Ynez, California. The horse's stud fee in 2012 was USD$1,250. Within nine years, he had sired 71 stakes winners who had earned $3,237,266. His most successful offspring include the New York Stallion Series winner Lady on the Run and Tenth Power.

Pedigree

References

Thoroughbred family 1-x
2000 racehorse births
2013 racehorse deaths
Racehorses bred in Kentucky
Racehorses trained in the United States